The Maitland Club was a Scottish historical and literary club and text publication society, modelled on the Roxburghe Club and the Bannatyne Club.  It took its name from Sir Richard Maitland (later Lord Lethington), the Scottish poet. The club was founded in Glasgow in 1828, to edit and publish early Scottish texts. Since the distribution of the publications was usually limited to members, the typical print run was between seventy and a hundred copies. The club was wound up in 1859, after publishing its own history as its 80th volume. The later Hunterian Club modelled themselves on the Maitland Club.

Presidents
 The Earl of Glasgow (around 1835)

Notable members
 Sir Michael Shaw-Stewart, 7th Baronet
 Robert Pitcairn
 Prince Augustus Frederick, Duke of Sussex
 John Campbell, 7th Duke of Argyll
 Walter Montagu Douglas Scott, 5th Duke of Buccleuch
 John Crichton-Stuart, 2nd Marquess of Bute
 Henry Cockburn, Lord Cockburn
 Sir David Hunter-Blair, 3rd Baronet
 Sir Thomas Makdougall-Brisbane
 Patrick Fraser Tytler
 Wilson Dobie Wilson
 Beriah Botfield
 James Dennistoun
 James Dunlop
 John Gibson Lockhart

Items published
 Scalacronica, 1836, edited by Joseph Stevenson from the MS at Corpus Christi College, Cambridge.
 Chronicon de Lanercost, 1839.

Further reading

Footnotes

External links
Royal Historical Society full listing of Maitland Club publications

Clubs and societies in Scotland
Text publication societies
Defunct learned societies of the United Kingdom
1828 establishments in Scotland
1859 disestablishments in Scotland